Cole Cubelic is a former college football player for the Auburn Tigers and current sports analyst.

Cubelic played center for the Tigers from 1996-2001. He graduated with a bachelor's degree in Communications and Media Studies. He joined ESPN in 2011 working as an analyst covering SEC football. In addition to the SEC, he also covered Sun Belt Conference football games. Beginning in 2009, Cubelic hosted the radio show "The Cube Show," which aired on WUMP in Huntsville, Alabama.  

In March 2018, Cubelic began hosting "Three Man Front" on WJOX-FM in Birmingham alongside Aaron Suttles and Landrum Roberts. On July 12th 2021, Cubelic began co-hosting a new morning drive show on WJOX-FM called, "McElroy and Cubelic in the Morning". The show paired him with ESPN on-air talent and former Alabama Crimson Tide quarterback Greg McElroy as the co-host. "McElroy and Cubelic in the Morning" currently airs on both WJOX-FM and WUMP from 7 AM to 10 AM CST.

References

Auburn Tigers football players
College football announcers
Year of birth missing (living people)
Living people